Harrison Wilson (born 22 November 1999 in Australia) is an Australian rugby union player who plays for the Queensland Reds in Super Rugby and Australian rugby union team, the Wallabies. His playing position is Number 8.

International career
Wilson made his debut in the Australian side on the 11th of October 2020 where he started in the number 6 jersey against New Zealand in a 16 all draw.

References

External links 
 Harry Wilson at Wallabies
 Harry Wilson at ItsRugby.co.uk
 Harry Wilson at ESPNscrum

1999 births
Australian rugby union players
Australia international rugby union players
Living people
Rugby union flankers
Queensland Country (NRC team) players
Queensland Reds players
Rugby union players from New South Wales